Mark Feuerstein (born June 8, 1971) is an American actor, writer, producer and director. He had an early, recurring role in several episodes of Caroline in the City, playing the title character's new boyfriend, and later gained notice in a guest appearance in an episode of Season 2 of Sex and the City. He went on to appear in TV series The West Wing (2001–2005), Royal Pains (2009–2016), Prison Break (2017), and co-wrote, co-produced as well as starred in the short-lived CBS sitcom 9JKL. In 2022, he received a Children's and Family Emmy Award for Outstanding Lead Performance nomination for his work in The Baby-Sitters Club.

Early life and education
Feuerstein was born in New York City, the son of Audrey, a school teacher, and Harvey Feuerstein, a lawyer. He was raised in a Jewish family, and celebrated his Bar Mitzvah in an Orthodox synagogue. He was a wrestler in high school and won the state championship. Feuerstein attended the Dalton School, and graduated from Princeton University in 1993. He won a Fulbright scholarship and studied at the London Academy of Music and Dramatic Art and at L'École Phillipe Gaulier in France.

Career
Feuerstein got his break-through on television as a cop on the daytime soap opera Loving. When director Nancy Meyers was casting What Women Want, her daughter recognized Feuerstein from Practical Magic (1998), and insisted that her mother cast him.

He came to public attention in a guest appearance in an episode of Season 2 of Sex and the City entitled "They Shoot Single People, Don't They?", playing an ophthalmologist named Josh who has sex with Miranda (played by Cynthia Nixon) but fails to give her an orgasm, despite repeated attempts and Miranda's coaching tips. The episode concludes with Miranda realizing that Josh will never satisfy her sexually and decides to fake her orgasm one last time. Josh punches the air with pride and yells "I'm the man!", while Miranda privately resolves to avoid him in the future. Feuerstein has publicly expressed regret for taking the role and has referred to it as his most-hated performance.

Feuerstein had a recurring role in Season 3 of The West Wing as a lawyer, and returned in the same role in Season 6. Feuerstein reunited with Practical Magic co-star, Sandra Bullock as her love interest in the film Two Weeks Notice (2002), but his scenes were deleted from the film. He was named one of People magazine's "50 Most Beautiful People" in 2003. In January 2009, Feuerstein began appearing in the web series The Hustler on Crackle.

Feuerstein starred in the lead role on the USA Network television show Royal Pains, from 2009 to 2016. He appeared as the super guest host of the June 14, 2010 edition of WWE Raw to promote the Royal Pains episode "Keeping the Faith".

In spring 2017, Feuerstein appeared as rogue CIA operative Jacob Ness in the Fox revival of its original hit series Prison Break.

Feuerstein co-created, with his wife, Dana Klein, and stars in the CBS sitcom 9JKL, which debuted in October 2017. Upon release, it received negative reviews from critics, with a 13% approval rating on Rotten Tomatoes. On May 12, 2018, the series was canceled after one season.

Personal life
He married television writer Dana Klein in 2005. They live in Los Angeles and have three children: Lila, Frisco, and Addie.

Filmography

Film

Television

References

External links

 

1971 births
Alumni of the London Academy of Music and Dramatic Art
American male film actors
American male television actors
American male voice actors
Dalton School alumni
Jewish American male actors
Living people
Male actors from New York City
Princeton University alumni
20th-century American male actors
21st-century American male actors
21st-century American Jews
Fulbright alumni